Radziki Duże  is a village in the administrative district of Gmina Wąpielsk, within Rypin County, Kuyavian-Pomeranian Voivodeship, in north-central Poland.

The village church of St. Catherine, originally a Gothic building of the 14th–15th century, was almost totally rebuilt in 1887. Hence it shows the typical appearance of a Gothic Revival building.

Furthermore Radziki Duże has the ruins of the medieval (1405–1466) castle of Radzikowski family, in ruins since 19th century, and the new ruin of a manor house.

References

Villages in Rypin County